The Venetian Patent Statute of March 19, 1474, established in the Republic of Venice the first statutory patent system in Europe, and may be deemed to be the earliest codified patent system in the world. The Statute is written in old Venetian. It provided that patents might be granted for "any new and ingenious device, not previously made", provided it was useful. By and large, these principles still remain the basic principles of patent law.

Significance
The dominant view among historians and legal scholars is that the Venetian Patent Act provides the legal foundation of the modern patent system. Meshbesher observing "the impact of the Venetian patent law and practice on the history of patent law has been studied by several authors and is well-recognized, hence the first patent statute [author's emphasis] is usually considered to be the one was enacted (sic) in the Republic of Venice in 1474". 

The most widely accepted translation of the old Venetian dialect original is as follows:

One leading patent scholar also stating that "the international patent experience of nearly 500 years has merely brought amendments or improvements upon the solid core established in Renaissance Venice".

Some historians question this dominant view and claim that the Venetian Patent Statute of 1474 "functioned primarily as a codification of prior customs [and] did not introduce new principles. "Neither did it mark the beginnings of the modern patent system." According to Joanna Kostylo, "[i]t should best understood as declaratory instrument codifying existing general principles and customs of granting patent rights for innovations in Venice". Accordingly she states that the significance of the Venetian statute lies "in its broad and general character," in the sense that it attempted to "apply general rules to the granting of patents rather than conferring occasional individual favours (gratiae) in response to individual petitions." It is also significant that the "legislation focuse[d] on protecting and rewarding individual inventors, in contrast to monopolies reserved to organized groups (guilds)."

This alternative view is hard to reconcile with the large shift in patenting activity observed after 1474. As observed by Allan Gomme, former librarian of the UK Patent Office, "there was, then, a regular practice of granting patents in Venice which began about 1475..". See also Statistics, below.  The majority view remains that the Venetian Patent Statute marked a watershed moment and was indeed the first basis for a patent system, notwithstanding earlier isolated patents having been issued.

Statistics
Between 1474 and 1788, the Venetian Senate granted about 2000 patents: 28 between 1474 and 1500, 593 between 1500 and 1600, 605 between 1600 and 1700, and 670 between 1700 and 1788. Venetian patents were granted free of payment, "which explains their relatively high number".

See also
Filippo Brunelleschi, famous Florentine architect and engineer, who claimed ownership over engineering techniques against "corporatist interests and monopoly of the guilds." In 1421, he effectively obtained a patent for a cargo boat. The Republic of Florence granted him a three-year exclusive right on his invention in exchange for disclosing it to the public. The cargo boat sank on its first voyage on the river Arno.

References

Further reading

Nard, Craig Allen and Morriss, Andrew P., Constitutionalizing Patents: From Venice to Philadelphia. Review of Law & Economic, Vol. 2, No. 2, 2006; Case Legal Studies Research Paper No. 04-12 . https://papers.ssrn.com/sol3/papers.cfm?abstract_id=585661

External links
Venetian Statute on Industrial Brevets, Venice (1474), Primary Sources on Copyright (1450–1900), Faculty of Law, University of Cambridge
Constitutionalizing Patents: From Venice to Philadelphia

1470s in law
History of patent law
Culture of the Republic of Venice
1474 establishments in Europe
15th-century establishments in the Republic of Venice